Hasina is a 2004 Kannada-language film by Girish Kasaravalli.The lead actress, Taara, won the National Film Award for Best Actress for her role as Hasina about the story of a Muslim Indian woman deserted by her husband.

Synopsis 

The film, based on the story Kari Nagaragalu by Kannada writer Banu Mushtaq, looks at Hasina (Taara) who marries auto driver Yakub (Chandrahas Ullal) against his mother's wishes. The couple have three daughters  the visually impaired Munni, Shubby and Habeeb. Pregnant with their fourth child, the couple break social codes and do a pregnancy scan to ascertain the baby's gender. When Yakub realises it is yet another girl, he becomes at turns abusive and neglectful, eventually leaving Hasina to fend for herself.

Cast 

Tara as Hasina
 Chandrahas Ullal as Yakoob
 Chitra Shenoy as Jhuleka Begum
 Purushottam Talavata as Muthuvalli Saab
 Ruthu as Muthuvalli's Wife
 Baby Bodhini as Munni

Awards and honours

DVD release 
Total Kannada Video released movie's DVD in August 2016,after a gap of 12 years of release.

References

External links 
 

2004 films
2000s Kannada-language films
Films featuring a Best Actress National Award-winning performance
Films directed by Girish Kasaravalli
Films that won the Best Costume Design National Film Award
Best Film on Family Welfare National Film Award winners